The Toyota H8909 engine family is a series of twin-turbocharged, four-stroke, 2.4-liter and 3.5-liter, V6 racing engines, made by Toyota Gazoo Racing for use in their TS050 and GR010 Hybrid Le Mans Prototype race cars, since 2016.

TS050 engine 
The TS050 Hybrid uses a 2.4-liter twin-turbocharged petrol V6, and features an 8-megajoule hybrid system, which uses lithium-ion batteries. The capacitor hybrid energy storage system was replaced with a new lithium-ion battery system, with the car now moving to the 8-megajoule LMP1 Hybrid sub-class. The ICE makes , and is complemented by electric motors, giving an additional .

GR010 engine 
The GR010 Hybrid's engine is an enlarged 3.5-liter twin-turbocharged petrol V6, with a hybrid system, which also uses lithium-ion batteries. The ICE now makes , plus another  from the electric motors.

Applications 
Toyota TS050 Hybrid
Toyota GR010 Hybrid

References

External links

Toyota engines
Toyota in motorsport
V6 engines
Gasoline engines by model
Engines by model